Boneh-ye Rashid (also Romanized as Boneh-ye Rashīd; also known as Bon-e Rashīd and Bon Rashid) is a village in Soltanabad Rural District, in the Central District of Ramhormoz County, Khuzestan Province, Iran. At the 2006 census, its population was 727, in 144 families.

References 

Populated places in Ramhormoz County